Beverly Law is professor emeritus at Oregon State University known for her research on forest ecosystems, especially with respect to carbon cycling, fire, and how human actions impact future climate.

Early life and education 
Law was born in St. Paul, Minnesota and grew up on a lake where her grandfather taught her about the woods; she describes herself as someone who loved birds, forests, and being outdoors. Going to college, she was split between marine biology and forest ecology, but decided on forest ecology after taking a class from Katherine Ewel. She earned her B.S. in forest management from the University of Florida in 1980. After college she worked at multiple places including AT&T, the University of Florida, and the Environmental Protection Agency in Oregon before going to Oregon State University where she earned her PhD. in forest science from Oregon State University in 1993.

Career 
Following her Ph.D., Law was a postdoc at Oregon State University in the College of Oceanic & Atmospheric Sciences until 1998 when she joined the faculty of the College of Forestry at Oregon State University. In 2006 she was promoted to professor; as of 2021 Law is professor emeritus at Oregon State University.

In a 2018 oral history interview, Law noted that she was always interested in a policy component to her research because the research is funded by tax payer dollars, and this is evident when she discusses retaining large, old growth trees that can capture carbon through presentations to Congress, presentations at websites, and newspapers.

Research 
Law's research combines direct measurements of forest data, remote sensing, and modeling that spans from regional to global scales. Her Ph.D. research established the metrics needed to estimate aerial coverage of different types of vegetation from space and then used that information to assess net primary production in Oregon. At Oregon State, she quantified temporal changes in respiration in a pine forest through measuring changes in carbon dioxide levels. While building the equipment needed to measure photosynthesis in this project she realized that the spikes in carbon dioxide were caused by cars waiting at a nearby traffic light which she described as an "ah-ha" moment that expanded her interest in global change research.

More recently, Law's research has examined the flux of gases between the land and the atmosphere. She is the lead investigator for the Oregon site of the Ameriflux project, one of the global network of sites within FLUXNET that use eddy covariance to measure carbon, water, and energy fluxes from terrestrial ecosystems. Law's research has revealed that allowing old-growth forests to live longer increases carbon storage by forests relative to planting of new forests. A 2020 investigation by ProPublica revealed that the Oregon Forest Resources Institute, a state-funded agency, was acting as a lobbying arm for the timber industry while discrediting this research despite the fact that the paper passed peer review.

In 2006, Law's student Daniel Donato, published a paper on the role of logging in the recovery of an area after a fire based on his research following the 2002 Biscuit Fire. The paper was controversial (e.g., Biscuit Fire publication controversy) and resulted in a series of articles following up the initial publication. Subsequent research by Law and colleagues revealed carbon emissions from the fire was 16 times higher than the region's annual production in the years prior to the fire.

Selected publications

Awards and honors 
 Research.com Best Female Scientist 2022
 Fellow, American Geophysical Union (2014)
 Aldo Leopold Leadership Fellow (2004)
 Norbert Gerbier-MUMM International Award, World Meteorological Organization for Law et al. (2002) paper, awarded 2004

References

External links 
 
 Oral History Interview with Law, Oregon State University Climate Change Research Oral History Collection, January 5, 2018

Living people
Year of birth missing (living people)
Fellows of the American Geophysical Union
University of Florida alumni
Oregon State University alumni
Oregon State University faculty
American climatologists
21st-century American women scientists